The Izadkhast Caravanserai is a historic site located in Izadkhast in Fars Province, central Iran. It was a caravanserai or roadside inn on the ancient Silk Road, serving caravaners and travelers as a place for rest and recovery during long journeys. It is situated in the historical complex of Izadkhast, lying in a natural low basin looking onto the Izadkhast Castle situated in the nearby high bedrock. Its construction dates to the early 17th century during the reign of Shah Abbas.

Izadkhast Caravanserai is one of just 25 caravanserais on the UNESCO List of Persian Caravanserai from among hundreds of other caravanserais from all over Iran. The complex of Izadkhast with the Izadkhast Caravanserai and Izadkhast Castle has been on the UNESCO Tentative List for World Heritage status since 2007.

Gallery

See also
 Complex of Izadkhast
 Izad-Khast Castle
 List of World Heritage Sites in Iran

References

Caravanserais in Iran
Buildings and structures in Fars Province